The 1900 Yukon general election was the first general election in the history of the Yukon territory held on October 18, 1900.

It elected members of the Yukon Territorial Council.

Campaign
The six-member Yukon Territorial Council was expanded to eight by adding two elected members. This was the smallest general election in Canadian history.

The election was held in a territory wide district, using Plurality block voting, with no constituencies. In total four candidates contested the election for the two seats -- two Government candidates and two Yukon Party candidates.

Election night

The official returns were read by appointed councilor Joseph Clarke.

Results

|- style="background:#ccc;"
! rowspan="2" colspan="2" style="text-align:center;"|Affiliation
!rowspan="2"|Candidates
! rowspan="2" style="text-align:center;"|Electedmembers
!colspan="2" style="text-align:center;"|Popular vote
|- style="background:#ccc;"
| style="text-align:center;"|#
| style="text-align:center;"|%

|align="right"|2
|align="right"|2 
|align="right"|2,460
|align="right"|63.62%

|align="right"|2
|align="right"|0 
|align="right"|1,407
|align="right"|36.38%
|-
|- style="background:#EAECF0;"
| style="text-align:left;" colspan="2"|Total
| style="text-align:right;"|4
| style="text-align:right;"|2
| style="text-align:right;"|3,867
| style="text-align:right;"|100%
|}

Vote total by candidates

References

Elections in Yukon
1900 elections in Canada
1900 in Yukon
October 1900 events